William Newell is the name of:
 William Newell (actor) (1894–1967), American actor
 William A. Newell (1817–1901), American physician and politician, Governor of New Jersey and Washington Territory
 William E. Newell (died 1976), electronics engineer and author
 William Wells Newell (1839–1907), American folklorist
 William Newell (MP) for Clitheroe (UK Parliament constituency)
 William Newell (rower) (born 1988), American rower